The Blues Book is an album by American jazz saxophonist Booker Ervin featuring performances recorded in 1964 for the Prestige label. The front cover photograph was taken by Don Schlitten of Booker outside of 16 Minetta Lane,
Greenwich Village, New York City.

Reception
The Allmusic review by Scott Yanow awarded the album 4½ stars and stated: "The consistently passionate Ervin makes each of the fairly basic originals sound fresh and the performances are frequently exciting inside/outside music".

Track listing
All compositions by Booker Ervin.

 "Eerie Dearie" – 14:30
 "One for Mort" – 6:24
 "No Booze Blooze" – 15:26
 "True Blue" – 5:07

Personnel
Booker Ervin – tenor saxophone
Carmell Jones – trumpet
Gildo Mahones – piano
Richard Davis – bass
Alan Dawson – drums

References

Prestige Records albums
Booker Ervin albums
1964 albums
Albums recorded at Van Gelder Studio
Albums produced by Don Schlitten